Messier 99 or M99, also known as NGC 4254, is a grand design spiral galaxy in the northern constellation Coma Berenices approximately  from the Milky Way. It was discovered by Pierre Méchain on 17 March 1781. The discovery was then reported to Charles Messier, who included the object in the Messier Catalogue of comet-like objects. It was one of the first galaxies in which a spiral pattern was seen. This pattern was first identified by Lord Rosse in the spring of 1846.

This galaxy has a morphological classification of SA(s)c, indicating a pure spiral shape with loosely wound arms. It has a peculiar shape with one normal looking arm and an extended arm that is less tightly wound. The galaxy is inclined by 42° to the line-of-sight with a major axis position angle of 68°. Four supernovae have been observed in this galaxy: SN 1967H (type II), 1972Q, 1986I (type II), and 2014L (type Ic).

A bridge of neutral hydrogen gas links NGC 4254 with VIRGOHI21, an HI region and a possible dark galaxy. The gravity from the latter may have distorted M99 and drawn out the gas bridge, as the two galaxy-sized objects may have had a close encounter before parting greatly. However, VIRGOHI21 may instead be tidal debris from an interaction with the lenticular galaxy NGC 4262 some 280 million years ago. It is expected that the drawn out arm will relax to match the normal arm once the encounter is over.

While not classified as a starburst galaxy, M99 has a star formation activity three times larger than other galaxies of similar Hubble type that may have been triggered by the encounter. M99 is likely entering the Virgo Cluster for the first time bound to the periphery of the cluster at a projected separation of 3.7°, or around one megaparsec, from the cluster center at Messier 87. The galaxy is undergoing ram-pressure stripping of much of its interstellar medium as it moves through the intracluster medium.


See also
 List of Messier objects
 Messier 83 - a similar face-on spiral galaxy
 Pinwheel Galaxy - a similar face-on spiral galaxy

References

External links 

 SEDS: Spiral Galaxy M99
 UniverseToday:  Dark Matter Galaxy?
 PPARC: New evidence for a Dark Matter Galaxy
 PTF10fqs: A Luminous Red Nova in the Spiral Galaxy Messier 99
 

Unbarred spiral galaxies
Messier 099
Messier 099
099
Messier 099
07345
39578
17810317
Discoveries by Pierre Méchain